Mihailo Marković, PhD (24 February 1923 – 7 February 2010) was a Serbian philosopher who gained prominence in the 1960s and 1970s as a proponent of the Praxis School, a Marxist humanist movement that originated in Yugoslavia.

He was a member of the Socialist Party of Serbia, co-author of the SANU Memorandum and a prominent supporter of Slobodan Milošević's politics in the late 1980s and 1990s.

Early life
Marković was born in Belgrade, Kingdom of Serbs, Croats and Slovenes. He became a member of the youth organization of the Communist Party of Yugoslavia (KPJ) in 1940, and in 1944 he became a member of the KPJ itself. As a partisan he actively participated in the struggle for liberation of Yugoslavia during World War II.

Academic career
Marković took a doctorate in philosophy first at the University of Belgrade Faculty of Philosophy in 1955, and then another in 1956 at University College London. There he studied logic under A. J. Ayer, and wrote his thesis on The Concept of Logic. In 1963 he became a full professor of philosophy at the University of Belgrade's Faculty of Philosophy, and the dean of the faculty in the period 1966–1967. From 1960 to 1962 he was the president of the Yugoslav Society of Philosophy. In the 1970s, he taught at the University of Michigan at Ann Arbor and was a director of the Institute of Philosophy at the University of Belgrade. He also taught for many years at the University of Pennsylvania, first as a frequent visiting professor from 1972 to 1980 and then as an adjunct professor from 1981 to 1993. Marković was a co-Chairman of the International Humanist and Ethical Union (1975–1985). He has been a corresponding member of the Serbian Academy of Sciences and Arts since 1963 and a full member since 1983.

In his honour, a collection of articles entitled Philosophy and Society was published in Belgrade in 1987.

Social critic
After the Resolution of the Informbiro condemning the Yugoslav communist regime, Marković took part in a fierce debate against Stalinist dogmatism, becoming one of the fiercest critics of the Stalinist philosophical theses. His Revision of the Philosophical Bases of Marxism in the USSR, published in 1952, was the first major attack on the Stalinist philosophy in Yugoslavia.

In the 1960s Marković became a major proponent of the Praxis School of Marxist interpretation, which emphasized the writings of young Marx, and their dialectical and humanist aspects in particular. He also actively contributed to the international journal Praxis. Due to his critical observations, together with seven other professors from the Faculty of Philosophy in Belgrade, Marković was suspended in January 1975, and finally lost his job in January 1981. After that, Marković worked in the Institute of Social Research until his retirement in 1986.

As a member of the Serbian Academy of Sciences and Arts (SANU) in 1986, Marković, together with others, wrote the SANU Memorandum, a document that has formulated the central tenets of Serbian nationalism. While the document has been viewed in some neighbouring former Yugoslav republics as a preparation for full-scale Greater Serbian expansionism, many Serbs considered it a realistic depiction of the Serbian position within Yugoslav federation.

During the Breakup of Yugoslavia, Marković considered that the borders of the country should be changed based on ethnic and historical grounds. Marković considered that the quasi-state Republic of Serbian Krajina, eastern Slavonia, Baranya and western Syrmia should not belong to Croatia because the Serbian people have lived in these territories for most of the centuries. He also considered that "the Albanian people lack any historical reasons to support their right to Kosovo", as they did not live in the territory before the arrival of the Slavs.

Political activity
Marković was vice-president of the Slobodan Milošević's Socialist Party of Serbia from 1990 to 1992, as well as its one time chief ideologue. At other times, he was a vocal critic of the official SPS party line. In November 1995 he was released from all duties in the party.

Bibliography
 Revision of the Philosophical Bases of Marxism in the USSR (1952)
 Logic (1956)
 Formalism in Contemporary Logic (1957)
 Dialectical Theory of Meaning, Belgrade 1961
 Humanism and Dialectics (1967)
 Dialektik der Praxis,  Humanizm i djalektika, Suhrkamp Verlag, Frankfurt am Main, 1968
 Att utveckla socialismen, Stockholm, 1971
 From Affluence to Praxis (Philosophy and social criticism), Ann Arbor, 1974
 The Contemporary Marx, Nottingham, 1974
 Philosophical Foundations of Science, Belgrade 1982
 Selected Works in eight volumes, Belgrade, 1994
 Freedom and Praxis, Belgrade 1997
 Social Thought at the Border of Milenia, 1999
 Storming the Sky: Memoirs, 2008

See also
 Simo Elaković

References

External links

 Mihailo Marković Archive
 The Notion of Revolution (in Serbian)
 Equality and Freedom (in Serbian)
 The Causes of breaking up of Yugoslavia (in Serbian)
 Reason and Ethos (in Serbian)
 The Memorandum: Roots of Serbian nationalism: an interview with Mihailo Marković and Vasilije Krestić
 Memorandum of the Serbian Academy of Sciences and Arts: Answer to the Criticisms
 Biography and Bibliography of Marković (in Serbian)
 1999 NIN article about Mihailo Marković and the Praxis School (in Serbian)
 Philosophy as a Way of Life – an interview with Mihailo Markovic (in Serbian)
 A sort of super-Serb defends Serbian policy – an interview with Markovic (in English)
 A Counter-revolution, and not all that velvety – an interview with Markovic (in English)
 Philosophy that is Lived – a tribute to Markovic (in Serbian)

1923 births
2010 deaths
Yugoslav Partisans members
Serbian atheists
Scholars of Marxism
Social philosophy
20th-century Serbian philosophers
Serbian political philosophers
Members of the Serbian Academy of Sciences and Arts
Serbian writers
Academic staff of the University of Belgrade
University of Belgrade Faculty of Philosophy alumni
Alumni of University College London
League of Communists of Serbia politicians
Socialist Party of Serbia politicians
Serbian humanists
Yugoslav philosophers
University of Michigan faculty